Arceneaux is a French surname. Notable people with the surname include:

Edgar Arceneaux (born 1972), American artist
Emmanuel Arceneaux (born 1987), professional Canadian football wide receiver
Fernest Arceneaux (1940–2008), American Zydeco musician
George Arceneaux (1928–1993), United States federal judge
Harold Arceneaux (born 1977), American professional basketball player
Hayley Arceneaux (born 1991), private astronaut
Stacey Arceneaux (1936–2015), retired American basketball player
Scott Arceneaux Jr. (born 1989), American rapper and producer

See also

-eaux
Arsenault
Arseneault
Arseneau

French-language surnames